Zərgəran (also, Zargeran) is a village in the Ismailli Rayon of Azerbaijan.  The village forms part of the municipality of Bizlan.

References 

Populated places in Ismayilli District